Dyschirius yezoensis is a species of ground beetle in the subfamily Scaritinae. It was described by Henry Walter Bates in 1883.

References

yezoensis
Beetles described in 1883